Reisjärvi is a municipality of Finland.

It is located in the province of Oulu and is part of the Northern Ostrobothnia region.

The municipality is unilingually Finnish.

Geography
Neighbouring municipalities are Haapajärvi, Kinnula, Lestijärvi, Pihtipudas and Sievi.

The habitation in Reisjärvi is clustered into villages ("kylä"). The locals might recognize at least the following villages: Keskusta (the center), Hylkiranta, Järvikylä, Kalaja, Kangaskylä, Kinnulanranta, Kiljanranta, Köyhänperä, Leppälahti, Levonperä, Lokkiperä, Metsäperä, Mäntyperä and Räisälänmäki.

Reisjärvi has a highly diverse nature, with many lakes, ponds and smaller rivers, rocks and cliffs but also marshes and lowlands.

A very remarkable sight of Reisjärvi nature is one of the northernmost in Finland habitats of wild Small-leaved Lime (Tilia cordata), 63° 38′ N (right after the northernmost reliably confirmed natural habitats in the municipality of Sonkajärvi in the vicinity of the lake of Kangaslampi, 63° 45′ N and near the hill of Salmisenmäki, 63° 43′ 42" N). Seven old long-boled limes continue to grow in a mixed forest on the cape of Kokkoniemi jutting out into the lake of Pitkäjärvi. The site is in private possession but it is a grove of national significance which has been under state protection since 13.04.1989. Following the Peuranpolku ("deer's path") trailing route, which begins in Reisjärvi, provides an excellent view into the landscape of the area. The cliffs and rock fields of the Raura area have been shaped by the ice age.

Politics
Reisjärvi has traditionally been a strong area for the Centre Party. For example, in the first round of 2006 presidential elections, the Centre Party candidate Matti Vanhanen got 57.1% of all votes from Reisjärvi. The municipal council of Reisjärvi is also dominated by the Centre Party: in the period 2004–2008 it held 15 positions against 4 positions for National Coalition Party and 1 for Social Democrats and Left Alliance each.

Events
 The Finnish Porcelain Summer, held between years 1996 and 2007, was an international get-together for porcelain painters and anyone interested in the art of porcelain. The main organizer was Aira Suomela.

See also
 Finnish national road 58

References

External links
 
 Municipality of Reisjärvi – Official website 

Municipalities of North Ostrobothnia
Populated places established in 1868